Abdulla Nasur  is a Uganda midfielder who played for Uganda in the 1978 African Cup of Nations.

External links

Year of birth missing (living people)
Living people
Ugandan footballers
Uganda international footballers
Association football midfielders
1978 African Cup of Nations players